This article lists the Ministers of Economy and Finance of Catalonia.

List

References

External links
 

 
 
Economy and Finance